In computer science, the precision of a numerical quantity is a measure of the detail in which the quantity is expressed.  This is usually measured in bits, but sometimes in decimal digits. It is related to precision in mathematics, which describes the number of digits that are used to express a value.

Some of the standardized precision formats are 
 Half-precision floating-point format
 Single-precision floating-point format
 Double-precision floating-point format
 Quadruple-precision floating-point format
 Octuple-precision floating-point format

Of these, octuple-precision format is rarely used. The single- and double-precision formats are most widely used and supported on nearly all platforms. The use of half-precision format has been increasing especially in the field of machine learning since many machine learning algorithms are inherently error-tolerant.

Rounding error

Precision is often the source of rounding errors in computation. The number of bits used to store a number will often cause some loss of accuracy. An example would be to store "sin(0.1)" in IEEE single precision floating point standard. The error is then often magnified as subsequent computations are made using the data (although it can also be reduced).

See also 
 Arbitrary-precision arithmetic
 Extended precision
 IEEE754 (IEEE floating point standard)
 Integer (computer science)
 Significant figures
 Truncation
 Approximate computing

References

Computer data
Approximations